Epipomponia elongata is a moth in the family Epipyropidae. It was described by Karl Jordan in 1928. It is found in South America.

References

Moths described in 1928
Epipyropidae